The 1897 South Carolina Gamecocks football team represented South Carolina College—now known as the University of South Carolina–as an independent during the 1897 college football season. Led by Frederick M. Murphy in his first and only season as head coach, South Carolina compiled a record of 0–3. South Carolina did not have another winless season until 1999.

Schedule

References

South Carolina
South Carolina Gamecocks football seasons
College football winless seasons
South Carolina Gamecocks football